HMS Fame was a 74-gun third rate ship of the line of the Royal Navy, built at Deptford Dockyard. The first elements of her keel were finally laid down on 22 January 1802, and Fame was launched on 8 October 1805.

Service

In November 1808, whilst under the command of Captain Bennet, Fame joined a squadron lying off Rosas, where Captain Lord Cochrane was assisting the Spanish in the defence of Castell de la Trinitat against the invading French army. Boats from Fame helped evacuate Cochrane's garrison forces after the fort's surrender on 5 December. On March 4, 1811, Argentine lawyer and journlist Mariano Moreno died on this ship while travelling on a diplomatic mission to England, his body was thrown into the water wrapped in a Unión Jack flag.

Fate

Fame was laid up in ordinary at Chatham in 1815. She was broken up in 1817.

Notes

References

Lavery, Brian (2003) The Ship of the Line - Volume 1: The development of the battlefleet 1650-1850. Conway Maritime Press. .

Ships of the line of the Royal Navy
Fame-class ships of the line
1805 ships
Ships built in Deptford